The Carter Handicap  is a Grade I American Thoroughbred horse race for three-years-old and older run over a distance of seven furlongs run annually in early April at Aqueduct Racetrack.

Race history 

First run in 1895, the race was named  for Brooklyn contractor and tugboat captain, William Carter, who put up most of the purse money and provided the trophy. The race was hosted by the old Aqueduct race track from 1895 to 1955, except for 1946 when it was held at Belmont Park. It returned to Belmont Park from 1956 to 1959, 1968 to 1974, and again in 1994. In 2020 the event was moved to Belmont Park and held in early June.

There was no race held in 1909, 1911–1913, and 1933–1934. It was run in two divisions in 1977 and 1978.

Race distance 
1895 –  miles  
1896 –  miles
1897 –  miles
1898 – about 7 furlongs
1899–1902  furlongs 
1903 onwards – 7 furlongs

Historic notes
The Carter Handicap is the only American Thoroughbred stakes race in which a triple dead heat for a win occurred when Brownie, Bossuet and Wait A Bit crossed the finish line at the same time in 1944. There was another dead heat between two horses in 1977, a year when the number of entrants resulted in the race being split into two divisions.

On June 13, 1942, Lillian Christopher's trainee Doublrab defeated the 1941 U.S. Triple Crown winner Whirlaway while equaling the Aqueduct track record of 1:23 flat in winning the seven furlong Carter Handicap.

Records
Time record: (at current 7 furlongs distance)
 1:20.04 – Artax (1999) (new race and track record)
 
Most wins:
 2 – Audacious (1920, 1921)
 2 – Osmand (1928, 1929)
 2 – Flying Heels (1930, 1931)
 2 – Forego (1974, 1975)
 2 – Lite the Fuse (1995, 1996)
 2 – Dads Caps (2014, 2015)
 
Most wins by an owner:
 4 – Greentree Stable (1943, 1950,1952, 1953)
 
Most wins by a jockey:
 4 – James Stout (1939, 1944, 1945, 1954)
 4 – Eddie Maple (1973, 1977, 1981, 1986)

Winners

References

 The 2009 Carter Handicap at the NTRA

Grade 1 stakes races in the United States
Graded stakes races in the United States
Open mile category horse races
Aqueduct Racetrack
Horse races in New York City
Recurring sporting events established in 1895
1895 establishments in New York City
Sports in Queens, New York